Manoora may refer to:
 Manoora, South Australia, a town in the Mid North region of South Australia
 Manoora, Queensland, a suburb of Cairns
 HMAS Manoora, either of two former ships of the Royal Australian Navy:
, a passenger liner requisitioned by the RAN in 1939 for use as an armed merchant cruiser and later a landing ship, and returned to her owners in 1949
, an amphibious transport ship acquired from the United States in 1994 and decommissioned in 2011